The Raymond and Catherine Fisher House is a house located in northeast Portland, Oregon listed on the National Register of Historic Places.

See also
 National Register of Historic Places listings in Northeast Portland, Oregon

References

Houses on the National Register of Historic Places in Portland, Oregon
Houses completed in 1929
Tudor Revival architecture in Oregon
1929 establishments in Oregon
Northeast Portland, Oregon